Horrungen is a mountain on the border of Skjåk Municipality and Lom Municipality in Innlandet county, Norway. The mountain is surrounded by several other notable mountains including Skardtind to the northeast, Trihøene to the north, Leirungshøi to the northeast, and Finndalshorungen to the east.

See also
List of mountains of Norway

References

Lom, Norway
Skjåk
Mountains of Innlandet